Mikheil Korkia (10 September 1948 – 7 February 2004) was a Georgian-Soviet basketball player who won gold with the Soviet basketball team in Basketball at the 1972 Summer Olympics. He played for Dynamo Tbilisi.

Trophies
 USSR Premier Basketball League (1): 1968
 USSR Basketball Cup (1): 1969

External links
 FIBA Profile
 Georgia National Olympic Committee Profile
 Mikheil Korkia in quotes - Ministry of Sport and Youth Affairs of Georgia 

Men's basketball players from Georgia (country)
1948 births
2004 deaths
People from Kutaisi
Olympic basketball players of the Soviet Union
Basketball players at the 1972 Summer Olympics
Basketball players at the 1976 Summer Olympics
Soviet men's basketball players
BC Dinamo Tbilisi players
Dynamo sports society athletes
Olympic gold medalists for the Soviet Union
Olympic bronze medalists for the Soviet Union
FIBA EuroBasket-winning players
Sportspeople from Kutaisi
Olympic medalists in basketball
Medalists at the 1976 Summer Olympics
Medalists at the 1972 Summer Olympics
Shooting guards